State Route 104 (SR-104) is a state highway in the U.S. state of Utah that sits completely within Ogden in Weber County.

Route description
From the western terminus at SR-126 (1900 West) in Ogden, the route is named 21st Street, a standard two-way, east–west minor arterial, with an interchange with I-15 near the west end. About half a mile west of the eastern terminus at SR-204 (Wall Ave), as it starts to pass over railroad tracks, the route splits into a one-way pair, with the eastbound lanes continuing as 21st street, and the westbound lanes located one block to the north as 20th Street.

History
The route was established in 1935.

In 1965, in order to relieve congestion on the inadequate 24th Street viaduct, the State Road Commission approved funds for the construction of 20th Street between SR-104 west of the railroads (Wilson Lane) and Wall Avenue for the 1968 fiscal year urban program. That route was deleted in 1969 and transferred to SR-104.

Major intersections

References

104
 104
State Route 104
State Route 104